American English is a second studio album by Wax released in 1987. It includes their biggest hit single "Bridge to Your Heart".

The album cover, designed by Storm Thorgerson, shows objects that all refer to wax.

The album was reissued in Japan in 2011 with bonus tracks including "People All Over The World", B-side to "In Some Other World" single, and singles' mixes of the songs "American English" and "Bridge to Your Heart".

Track listing
All songs were written by Andrew Gold and Graham Gouldman, except where noted.

Side one
 "American English" – 4:25
 "In Some Other World" – 4:45
 "Ready or Not" – 3:31
 "Call It Destiny" – 4:03
 "Bridge to Your Heart" – 4:14

Side two
 "Share the Glory" (Paul Bliss, Phil Palmer) – 3:56
 "Alright Tonight" – 4:14
 "The Promise" – 3:14
 "Heaven in Her Bed" – 4:36
 "Bug in the Machine" – 4:21

Personnel
 Andrew Gold – vocals, backing vocals, keyboards, guitar on track 10, drums and programming, production on tracks 4, 9, and 10
 Graham Gouldman – bass guitar, backing vocals, guitar on tracks 1–5, and 7–9, vocals on track 10, production on tracks 4, 9, and 10
 Christopher Neil – production on tracks 1–3, and 5–8, backing vocals
 Phil Palmer – guitar on track 6
 Adrian Lee – keyboards
 Wix – keyboards
 Paul Bliss - keyboards and programming on track 6
 Peter Van Hooke – drums and programming
 Paul Carrack – backing vocals
 Tessa Niles – backing vocals
 Jackie Rawe – backing vocals
 Lorna Wright – voice on track 1
 Raissa Danilou – voice on track 1
 Kyoko Ono – voice on track 1
 Ruth Cuenca – voice on track 1
Technical
 Simon Hurrell – engineer, recording engineer on tracks 1–9, mixing engineer on tracks 1–3, and 5–10
 Peter Jones – recording engineer on track 10, assistant recording engineer on tracks 1–9, assistant mixing engineer
 Ian Cooper – Mastering at the Town House, London
 Storm Thorgerson – design
 Christopher Bissell – photography

Charts

References

1987 albums
Wax (British band) albums
Albums produced by Christopher Neil
Albums with cover art by Storm Thorgerson
Albums produced by Andrew Gold
Albums produced by Graham Gouldman
RCA Records albums